The Kargil War, also known as the Kargil conflict, was fought between India and Pakistan from May to July 1999 in the Kargil district of Jammu and Kashmir and elsewhere along the Line of Control (LoC). In India, the conflict is also referred to as Operation Vijay, which was the codename of the Indian military operation in the region. The Indian Air Force acted jointly with the Indian Army to flush out the Pakistan Army and paramilitary troops from vacated Indian positions along the LoC, in what was designated as Operation Safed Sagar.

The conflict was triggered by the infiltration of Pakistani troops—disguised as Kashmiri militants—into strategic positions on the Indian side of the LoC, which serves as the de facto border between the two countries in the disputed region of Kashmir. During its initial stages, Pakistan blamed the fighting entirely on independent Kashmiri insurgents, but documents left behind by casualties and later statements by Pakistan's Prime Minister and Chief of Army Staff showed the involvement of Pakistani paramilitary forces, led by General Ashraf Rashid. The Indian Army, later supported by the Indian Air Force, recaptured a majority of the positions on the Indian side of the LoC; facing international diplomatic opposition, Pakistani forces withdrew from all remaining Indian positions along the LoC.

The Kargil War is the most recent example of high-altitude warfare in mountainous terrain, and as such, posed significant logistical problems for the combatting sides. It also marks one of only two instances of conventional warfare between nuclear-armed states (alongside the Sino-Soviet border conflict). India had conducted its first successful test in 1974; Pakistan, which had been developing its nuclear capability in secret since around the same time, conducted its first known tests in 1998, just two weeks after a second series of tests by India.

Location

Before the Partition of India in 1947, Kargil was a tehsil of Ladakh, a sparsely populated region with diverse linguistic, ethnic and religious groups, living in isolated valleys separated by some of the world's highest mountains. The Indo-Pakistani War of 1947-1948 concluded with the Line of Control bisecting the Ladakh district, with the Skardu tehsil going to Pakistan (now part of Gilgit-Baltistan). After Pakistan's defeat in the Indo-Pakistani War of 1971, the two nations signed the Simla Agreement promising not to engage in armed conflict with respect to that boundary.

Like other areas in the Himalayas, Kargil has a continental climate.

An Indian national highway (NH 1) connecting Srinagar to Leh cuts through Kargil. Apart from the district capital, Kargil, the populated areas near the front line in the conflict included the Mushkoh Valley and the town of Drass, southwest of Kargil, as well as the Batalik sector and other areas northeast of Kargil.

Kargil was targeted partly because the terrain was conducive to the preemptive seizure of several unoccupied military positions. With tactically vital features and well-prepared defensive posts atop the peaks, a defender on the high ground would enjoy advantages akin to that of a fortress. Any attack to dislodge a defender from high ground in mountain warfare requires a far higher ratio of attackers to defenders, and the difficulties would be exacerbated by the high altitude and freezing temperatures.

Kargil is just  from the Pakistani-controlled town of Skardu, which was capable of providing logistical and artillery support to Pakistani combatants. A road between Kargil and Skardu exists, which was closed in 1949.

Background

After the Indo-Pakistani War of 1971, there had been a long period with relatively few direct armed conflicts involving the military forces of the two neighbours—notwithstanding the efforts of both nations to control the Siachen Glacier by establishing military outposts on the surrounding mountains ridges and the resulting military skirmishes in the 1980s. During the 1990s, however, escalating tensions and conflict due to separatist activities in Kashmir, some of which were supported by Pakistan, as well as the conducting of nuclear tests by both countries in 1998, led to an increasingly belligerent atmosphere. In an attempt to defuse the situation, both countries signed the Lahore Declaration in February 1999, promising to provide a peaceful and bilateral solution to the Kashmir conflict.

During the winter of 1998–1999, some elements of the Pakistani Armed Forces were covertly training and sending Pakistani troops and paramilitary forces, some allegedly in the guise of mujahideen, into territory on the Indian side of the LOC. The infiltration was codenamed "Operation Badr"; its aim was to sever the link between Kashmir and Ladakh, and cause Indian forces to withdraw from the Siachen Glacier, thus forcing India to negotiate a settlement of the broader Kashmir dispute. Pakistan also believed that any tension in the region would internationalise the Kashmir issue, helping it to secure a speedy resolution. Yet another goal may have been to boost the morale of the decade-long rebellion in Jammu and Kashmir by taking a proactive role.

Pakistani Lieutenant General Shahid Aziz, and then head of ISI analysis wing, has confirmed there were no mujahideen but only regular Pakistan Army soldiers who took part in the Kargil War. "There were no Mujahideen, only taped wireless messages, which fooled no one. Our soldiers were made to occupy barren ridges, with hand held weapons and ammunition", Lt Gen Aziz wrote in his article in The Nation daily in January 2013.

Some writers have speculated that the operation's objective may also have been retaliation for India's Operation Meghdoot in 1984 that seized much of Siachen Glacier.

According to India's then army chief Ved Prakash Malik, and many scholars, much of the background planning, including construction of logistical supply routes, had been undertaken much earlier. On several occasions during the 1980s and 1990s, the army had given Pakistani leaders (Zia ul Haq and Benazir Bhutto) similar proposals for infiltration into the Kargil region, but the plans had been shelved for fear of drawing the nations into all-out war.

Some analysts believe that the blueprint of attack was reactivated soon after Pervez Musharraf was appointed chief of army staff in October 1998. After the war, Nawaz Sharif, Prime Minister of Pakistan during the Kargil conflict, claimed that he was unaware of the plans, and that he first learned about the situation when he received an urgent phone call from Atal Bihari Vajpayee, his counterpart in India. Sharif attributed the plan to Musharraf and "just two or three of his cronies", a view shared by some Pakistani writers who have stated that only four generals, including Musharraf, knew of the plan. Musharraf, however, asserted that Sharif had been briefed on the Kargil operation 15 days ahead of Vajpayee's journey to Lahore on 20 February.

War progress

Conflict events

There were three major phases to the Kargil War. First, Pakistan infiltrated forces into the Indian-controlled section of Kashmir and occupied strategic locations enabling it to bring NH1 within range of its artillery fire. The next stage consisted of India discovering the infiltration and mobilising forces to respond to it. The final stage involved major battles by Indian and Pakistani forces resulting in India recapturing most of the territories held by Pakistani forces and the subsequent withdrawal of Pakistani forces back across the LOC after international pressure.

Occupation by Pakistan

During February 1999, the Pakistan Army sent forces to occupy some posts on the Indian side of the LOC. Troops from the elite Special Services Group as well as four to seven battalions of the Northern Light Infantry (a paramilitary regiment not part of the regular Pakistani army at that time) covertly and overtly set up bases on 132 vantage points of the Indian-controlled region. According to some reports, these Pakistani forces were backed by Kashmiri guerrillas and Afghan mercenaries. According to General Ved Malik, the bulk of the infiltration occurred in April.

Pakistani intrusions took place in the heights of the lower Mushkoh Valley, along the Marpo La ridgeline in Dras, in Kaksar near Kargil, in the Batalik sector east of the Indus River, on the heights above of the Chorbat La sector where the LOC turns North and in the Turtuk sector south of the Siachen area.

India discovers infiltration and mobilises
Initially, these incursions were not detected for a number of reasons: Indian patrols were not sent into some of the areas infiltrated by the Pakistani forces and heavy artillery fire by Pakistan in some areas provided cover for the infiltrators. But by the second week of May, the ambushing of an Indian patrol team led by Capt Saurabh Kalia, who acted on a tip-off by a local shepherd in the Batalik sector, led to the exposure of the infiltration. Initially, with little knowledge of the nature or extent of the infiltration, the Indian troops in the area assumed that the infiltrators were jihadis and claimed that they would evict them within a few days. Subsequent discovery of infiltration elsewhere along the LOC, and the difference in tactics employed by the infiltrators, caused the Indian army to realise that the plan of attack was on a much bigger scale.

The Government of India responded with Operation Vijay, a mobilisation of 200,000 Indian troops. However, because of the nature of the terrain, division and corps operations could not be mounted; subsequent fighting was conducted mostly at the brigade or battalion level. In effect, two divisions of the Indian Army, numbering 20,000, plus several thousand from the Paramilitary forces of India and the air force were deployed in the conflict zone. The total number of Indian soldiers that were involved in the military operation on the Kargil-Drass sector was thus close to 30,000. The number of infiltrators, including those providing logistical backup, has been put at approximately 5,000 at the height of the conflict. This figure includes troops from Pakistan-administered Kashmir who provided additional artillery support.

The Indian Air Force launched Operation Safed Sagar in support of the mobilisation of Indian land forces on 26 May. The Indian government cleared limited use of Air Power only on 25 May, for fear of undesirable escalation, with the fiat that IAF fighter jets were not to cross the LOC under any circumstance. The rarified air at these altitudes affected ballistic trajectories of air to ground weapons, such as rockets, dumb and laser guided bombs. There was no opposition at all by the Pakistani Air Force, leaving the IAF free to carry out its attacks with impunity. The total air dominance of the IAF gave the aircrew enough time to modify aiming indices and firing techniques, increasing its effectiveness during the high altitude war. Poor weather conditions and range limitations intermittently affected bomb loads and the number of airstrips that could be used, except for the Mirage 2000 fleet, which commenced operations on 30 May.

Naval action
The Indian Navy also prepared to blockade the Pakistani ports (primarily the Karachi port) to cut off supply routes under Operation Talwar. The Indian Navy's western and eastern fleets joined in the North Arabian Sea and began aggressive patrols and threatened to cut Pakistan's sea trade. This exploited Pakistan's dependence on sea-based oil and trade flows. Later, then–Prime Minister of Pakistan Nawaz Sharif disclosed that Pakistan was left with just six days of fuel to sustain itself if a full-scale war had broken out.

India attacks Pakistani positions

The terrain of Kashmir is mountainous and at high altitudes; even the best roads, such as National Highway 1 (India) (NH1) from Srinagar to Leh, are only two lanes. The rough terrain and narrow roads slowed down traffic, and the high altitude, which affected the ability of aircraft to carry loads, made control of NH 1 (the actual stretch of the highway which was under Pakistani fire) a priority for India. From their 130+ covertly occupied observation posts, the Pakistani forces had a clear line-of-sight to lay down indirect artillery fire on NH 1, inflicting heavy casualties on the Indians. This was a serious problem for the Indian Army as the highway was the main logistical and supply route. The Pakistani shelling of the arterial road threatened to cut  Leh off, though an alternative (and longer) road to Leh existed via Himachal Pradesh, the Leh–Manali Highway.

The infiltrators, apart from being equipped with small arms and grenade launchers, were also armed with mortars, artillery and anti-aircraft guns. Many posts were also heavily mined, with India later stating to have recovered more than 8,000 anti-personnel mines according to an ICBL report. Pakistan's reconnaissance was done through unmanned aerial vehicles and AN/TPQ-36 Firefinder radars supplied by the US. The initial Indian attacks were aimed at controlling the hills overlooking NH 1, with high priority being given to the stretches of the highway near the town of Kargil. The majority of posts along the LOC were adjacent to the highway, and therefore the recapture of nearly every infiltrated post increased both the territorial gains and the security of the highway. The protection of this route and the recapture of the forward posts were thus ongoing objectives throughout the war.

The Indian Army's first priority was to recapture peaks that were in the immediate vicinity of NH 1. This resulted in Indian troops first targeting the Tiger Hill and Tololing complex in Dras, which dominated the Srinagar-Leh route. This was soon followed by the Batalik-Turtok sub-sector which provided access to Siachen Glacier. Some of the peaks that were of vital strategic importance to the Pakistani defensive troops were Point 4590 and Point 5353. While 4590 was the nearest point that had a view of NH 1, point 5353 was the highest feature in the Dras sector, allowing the Pakistani troops to observe NH 1. The recapture of Point 4590 by Indian troops on 14 June was significant, notwithstanding the fact that it resulted in the Indian Army suffering the most casualties in a single battle during the conflict. Although most of the posts in the vicinity of the highway were cleared by mid-June, some parts of the highway near Drass witnessed sporadic shelling until the end of the war.

Once India regained control of the hills overlooking NH 1, the Indian Army turned to driving the invading force back across the LOC. The Battle of Tololing, amongst other assaults, slowly tilted the combat in India's favour. The Pakistani troops at Tololing were aided by Pakistani fighters from Kashmir. Some of the posts put up a stiff resistance, including Tiger Hill (Point 5140) that fell only later in the war. Indian troops found well-entrenched Pakistani soldiers at Tiger Hill, and both sides suffered heavy casualties. After a final assault on the peak in which ten Pakistani soldiers and five Indian soldiers were killed, Tiger Hill finally fell. A few of the assaults occurred atop hitherto unheard of peaks—most of them unnamed with only Point numbers to differentiate them—which witnessed fierce hand to hand combat.

As the operation was fully underway, about 250 artillery guns were brought in to clear the infiltrators in the posts that were in the line-of-sight. The Bofors FH-77B field howitzer played a vital role, with Indian gunners making maximum use of the terrain. However, its success was limited elsewhere due to the lack of space and depth to deploy it.

The Indian Air Force was tasked to act jointly with ground troops on 25 May. The code name assigned to their role was Operation Safed Sagar It was in this type of terrain that aerial attacks were used, initially with limited effectiveness. On 27 May 1999, the IAF lost a MiG-27 strike aircraft piloted by Flt. Lt. Nachiketa, which it attributed to an engine failure, and a MiG-21 fighter piloted by Sqn Ldr Ajay Ahuja which was shot down by the Pakistani army, both over Batalik sector.; initially Pakistan said it shot down both jets after they crossed into its territory. According to reports, Ahuja had bailed out of his stricken plane safely but was apparently killed by his captors as his body was returned riddled with bullet wounds. One Indian Mi-8 helicopter was also lost due to Stinger SAMs. French made Mirage 2000H of the IAF were tasked to drop laser-guided bombs to destroy well-entrenched positions of the Pakistani forces and flew its first sortie on 30 May. The effects of the pinpoint non-stop bombing by the Mirage-2000, by day and by night, became evident with almost immediate effect.

In many vital points, neither artillery nor air power could dislodge the outposts manned by the Pakistani soldiers, who were out of visible range. Since any daylight attack would be suicidal, all the advances had to be made under the cover of darkness, escalating the risk of freezing. Accounting for the wind chill factor, the temperatures were often as low as  near the mountain tops. Based on military tactics, much of the costly frontal assaults by the Indians could have been avoided if the Indian Military had chosen to blockade the supply route of the opposing force, creating a siege. Such a move would have involved the Indian troops crossing the LOC as well as initiating aerial attacks on Pakistani soil, however, a manoeuvre India was not willing to exercise due to the likely expansion of the theatre of war and reduced international support for its cause.

Two months into the conflict, Indian troops had slowly retaken most of the ridges that were encroached upon by the infiltrators; according to the official count, an estimated 75–80% of the intruded area and nearly all the high ground were back under Indian control.

Washington Accord and final battles
Following the outbreak of armed fighting, Pakistan sought American help in de-escalating the conflict. Bruce Riedel, who was then an aide to President Bill Clinton, reported that US intelligence had imaged Pakistani movements of nuclear weapons to forward deployments for fear of the Kargil hostilities escalating into a wider conflict. However, President Clinton refused to intervene until Pakistan had removed all forces from the Indian side of the LOC.

Following the Washington accord of 4 July 1999, when Sharif agreed to withdraw Pakistani troops, most of the fighting came to a gradual halt, but some Pakistani forces remained in positions on the Indian side of the LoC. In addition, the United Jihad Council (an umbrella for extremist groups) rejected Pakistan's plan for a climb-down, instead deciding to fight on.

The Indian army launched its final attacks in the last week of July in co-ordination with relentless attacks by the IAF, both by day and night, in their totally successful Operation Safed Sagar; as soon as the Drass subsector had been cleared of Pakistani forces, the fighting ceased on 26 July. The day has since been marked as Kargil Vijay Diwas (Kargil Victory Day) in India. In the wake of its successive military defeats in Kargil, diplomatic isolation in the international arena,  its precarious economic situation, and the mounting international pressure, the Pakistani establishment was compelled to negotiate a face saving withdrawal from the residual areas on the Indian side of the LoC, thereby restoring the sanctity of the LoC, as was established in July 1972 as per the Simla Agreement.

World opinion
Pakistan was heavily criticised by other countries for instigating the war, as its paramilitary forces and insurgents had crossed the LOC (Line of Control). Pakistan's primary diplomatic response, one of plausible deniability linking the incursion to what it officially termed as "Kashmiri freedom fighters", was in the end not successful. Veteran analysts argued that the battle was fought at heights where only seasoned troops could survive, so poorly equipped "freedom fighters" would neither have the ability nor the wherewithal to seize land and defend it. Moreover, while the army had initially denied the involvement of its troops in the intrusion, two soldiers were awarded the Nishan-E-Haider (Pakistan's highest military honour). Another 90 soldiers were also given gallantry awards, most of them posthumously, confirming Pakistan's role in the episode. India also released taped phone conversations between the Army Chief and a senior Pakistani general where the latter is recorded saying: "the scruff of [the militants] necks is in our hands", although Pakistan dismissed it as a "total fabrication". Concurrently, Pakistan made several contradicting statements, confirming its role in Kargil, when it defended the incursions saying that the LOC itself was disputed. Pakistan also attempted to internationalise the Kashmir issue, by linking the crisis in Kargil to the larger Kashmir conflict, but such a diplomatic stance found few backers on the world stage.

As the Indian counter-attacks picked up momentum, Pakistani prime minister Nawaz Sharif flew to meet US President Bill Clinton on 4 July to obtain support from the United States. Clinton rebuked Sharif, however, and asked him to use his contacts to rein in the militants and withdraw Pakistani soldiers from Indian territory. Clinton would later reveal in his autobiography that "Sharif's moves were perplexing" since the Indian Prime Minister had travelled to Lahore to promote bilateral talks aimed at resolving the Kashmir problem and "by crossing the Line of Control, Pakistan had wrecked the [bilateral] talks". On the other hand, he applauded Indian restraint for not crossing the LOC and escalating the conflict into an all-out war.

G8 nations supported India and condemned the Pakistani violation of the LOC at the Cologne summit. The European Union also opposed Pakistan's violation of the LOC. China, a long-time ally of Pakistan, insisted on a pullout of forces to the pre-conflict positions along the LOC and settling border issues peacefully. Other organisations like the ASEAN Regional Forum too supported India's stand on the inviolability of the LOC.

Faced with growing international pressure, Sharif managed to pull back the remaining soldiers from Indian territory. The joint statement issued by Clinton and Sharif conveyed the need to respect the LOC and resume bilateral talks as the best forum to resolve all disputes.

Gallantry awards

India

A number of Indian soldiers earned awards for gallantry. Four Param Vir Chakras and 11 Maha Vir Chakras were awarded.

The following units were awarded the COAS' unit citations for their exemplary role in the war -
Infantry
2 Rajputana Rifles
8 Sikh
17 Jat
18 Grenadiers
1 Bihar
13 Jammu and Kashmir Rifles
18 Garhwal Rifles
12 Jammu and Kashmir Light Infantry
2 Naga
1/11 Gorkha Rifles
Ladakh Scouts
Artillery
108 Medium Regiment
141 Field Regiment
197 Field Regiment
Army Aviation Corps
663 (Reconnaissance and Observation) Squadron
666 (Reconnaissance and Observation) Squadron
Army Service Corps
874 Animal Transport Battalion

Pakistan 
Two Pakistani soldiers received the Nishan-e-Haider, Pakistan's highest military gallantry award:
 Capt. Karnal Sher Khan, 27th Battalion, Sind Regiment: Nishan-e-Haider (posthumous)
 Hav. Lalak Jan, Northern Light Infantry: Nishan-e-Haider (posthumous)

Impact and influence of media
The Kargil War was significant for the impact and influence of the mass media on public opinion in both nations. Coming at a time of exploding growth in electronic journalism in India, the Kargil news stories and war footage were often telecast live on TV, and many websites provided in-depth analysis of the war. The conflict became the first "live" war in South Asia and it was given such detailed media coverage that one effect was the drumming up of jingoistic feelings.

The conflict soon turned into a news propaganda war, in which press briefings given by government officials of each nation produced conflicting claims and counterclaims. The Indian government placed a temporary News Embargo on information from Pakistan, banning the telecast of the state-run Pakistani channel PTV and blocking access to online editions of the Dawn newspaper. The Pakistani media criticised this apparent curbing of freedom of the press in India, while India media claimed it was in the interest of national security. The Indian government ran advertisements in foreign publications including The Times and The Washington Post detailing Pakistan's role in supporting extremists in Kashmir in an attempt to garner political support for its position.

As the war progressed, media coverage of the conflict was more intense in India than in Pakistan. Many Indian channels showed images from the battle zone in a style reminiscent of CNN's coverage of the Gulf War (one of the shells fired by Pakistan troops even hit a Doordarshan transmission centre in Kargil; coverage continued, however). Reasons for India's increased coverage included the greater number of privately owned electronic media in India compared to Pakistan and relatively greater transparency in the Indian media. At a seminar in Karachi, Pakistani journalists agreed that while the Indian government had taken the press and the people into its confidence, Pakistan had not.

The print media in India and abroad was largely sympathetic to the Indian cause, with editorials in newspapers based in the west and other neutral countries observing that Pakistan was largely responsible for the conflict. Some analysts believe that Indian media, which was both larger in number and more credible, may have acted as a force multiplier for the Indian military operation in Kargil and served as a morale booster. As the fighting intensified, the Pakistani version of events found little backing on the world stage. This helped India gain valuable diplomatic recognition for its position.

WMDs and the nuclear factor
Since Pakistan and India each had weapons of mass destruction, many in the international community were concerned that if the Kargil conflict intensified, it could lead to nuclear war. Both countries had tested their nuclear capability in 1998 (India conducted its first test in 1974 while it was Pakistan's first-ever nuclear test). Many pundits believed the tests to be an indication of the escalating stakes in the scenario in South Asia. When the Kargil conflict started just a year after the nuclear tests, many nations desired to end it before it intensified.

International concerns increased when Pakistani foreign secretary Shamshad Ahmad made a statement on 31 May warning that an escalation of the limited conflict could lead Pakistan to use "any weapon" in its arsenal. This was immediately interpreted as a threat of nuclear retaliation by Pakistan in the event of an extended war, and the belief was reinforced when the leader of Pakistan's senate noted, "The purpose
of developing weapons becomes meaningless if they are not used when they are needed". Many such ambiguous statements from officials of both countries were viewed as warnings of an impending nuclear crisis where the combatants would consider use of their limited nuclear arsenals in "tactical" nuclear warfare in the belief that it would not have ended in mutual assured destruction, as could have occurred in a nuclear conflict between the United States and the USSR. Some experts believe that following nuclear tests in 1998, the Pakistani military was emboldened by its nuclear deterrent to markedly increase coercion against India.

The nature of the India-Pakistan conflict took a more sinister turn when the United States received intelligence that Pakistani nuclear warheads were being moved towards the border. Bill Clinton tried to dissuade Pakistan prime minister Nawaz Sharif from nuclear brinkmanship, even threatening Pakistan of dire consequences. According to a White House official, Sharif seemed to be genuinely surprised by this supposed missile movement and responded that India was probably planning the same. In an article published in a defence journal in 2000, Sanjay Badri-Maharaj, a security expert, claimed while quoting another expert that India too had readied at least five nuclear-tipped ballistic missiles.

Sensing a deteriorating military scenario, diplomatic isolation, and the risks of a larger conventional and nuclear war, Sharif ordered the Pakistani army to vacate the Kargil heights. He later claimed in his official biography that General Pervez Musharraf had moved nuclear warheads without informing him. Recently however, Pervez Musharraf revealed in his memoirs that Pakistan's nuclear delivery system was not operational during the Kargil war; something that would have put Pakistan under serious disadvantage if the conflict went nuclear.

The threat of WMD included chemical and even biological weapons. Pakistan accused India of using chemical weapons and incendiary weapons such as napalm against the Kashmiri fighters. India, on the other hand, showcased a cache of gas masks as proof that Pakistan may have been prepared to use non-conventional weapons. US official and the Organisation for the Prohibition of Chemical Weapons determined that Pakistani allegations of India using banned chemicals in its bombs were unfounded.

Aftermath

India

From the end of the war until February 2000, the Indian stock market rose by more than 30%. The next Indian national budget included major increases in military spending.

There was a surge in patriotism, with many celebrities expressing their support for the Kargil cause. Indians were angered by media reports of the death of pilot Ajay Ahuja, especially after Indian authorities reported that Ahuja had been murdered and his body mutilated by Pakistani troops. The war had produced higher than expected fatalities for the Indian military, with a sizeable percentage of them including newly commissioned officers. One month after conclusion of the Kargil War, the Atlantique Incident, in which a Pakistan Navy plane was shot down by India, briefly reignited fears of a conflict between the two countries.

After the war, the Indian government severed ties with Pakistan and increased defence preparedness. India increased its defence budget as it sought to acquire more state of the art equipment. Media reported about military procurement irregularities and criticism of intelligence agencies like Research and Analysis Wing, which failed to predict the intrusions or the identity/number of infiltrators during the war. An internal assessment report by the armed forces, published in an Indian magazine, showed several other failings, including "a sense of complacency" and being "unprepared for a conventional war" on the presumption that nuclearism would sustain peace. It also highlighted the lapses in command and control, the insufficient troop levels and the dearth of large-calibre guns like the Bofors. In 2006, retired Air Chief Marshal, A. Y. Tipnis, alleged that the Indian Army did not fully inform the government about the intrusions, adding that the army chief Ved Prakash Malik, was initially reluctant to use the full strike capability of the Indian Air Force, instead requesting only helicopter gunship support. Soon after the conflict, India also decided to complete the project, previously stalled by Pakistan, to fence the entire LOC.

The end of the Kargil conflict was followed by the 13th Indian General Elections to the Lok Sabha, which gave a decisive mandate to the National Democratic Alliance (NDA) government. It was re-elected to power in September–October 1999 with a majority of 303 seats out of 545 in the Lok Sabha. On the diplomatic front, Indo-US relations improved, as the United States appreciated Indian attempts to restrict the conflict to a limited geographic area. Relations with Israel—which had discreetly aided India with ordnance supply and matériel such as unmanned aerial vehicles, laser-guided bombs, and satellite imagery—also were bolstered.

The end and victory of the Kargil War is celebrated annually in India as Kargil Vijay Diwas.

Kargil Review Committee

Soon after the war the Atal Bihari Vajpayee government set up an inquiry into its causes and to analyse perceived Indian intelligence failures. The high-powered committee was chaired by eminent strategic affairs analyst K. Subrahmanyam and given powers to interview anyone with current or past associations with Indian security, including former Prime Ministers. The committee's final report (also referred to as the "Subrahmanyam Report") led to a large-scale restructuring of Indian Intelligence. It, however, came in for heavy criticism in the Indian media for its perceived avoidance of assigning specific responsibility for failures over detecting the Kargil intrusions. The committee was also embroiled in controversy for indicting Brigadier Surinder Singh of the Indian Army for his failure to report enemy intrusions in time, and for his subsequent conduct. Many press reports questioned or contradicted this finding and claimed that Singh had in fact issued early warnings that were ignored by senior Indian Army commanders and, ultimately, higher government functionaries.

In a departure from the norm the final report was published and made publicly available. Some chapters and all annexures, however, were deemed to contain classified information by the government and not released. K. Subrahmanyam later wrote that the annexures contained information on the development of India's nuclear weapons program and the roles played by Prime Ministers Rajiv Gandhi, P. V. Narasimha Rao and V. P. Singh.

Pakistan

Shortly after declaring itself a nuclear weapons state, Pakistan had been humiliated diplomatically and militarily. Faced with the possibility of international isolation, the already fragile Pakistan economy was weakened further. The morale of Pakistan forces after the withdrawal declined as many units of the Northern Light Infantry suffered heavy casualties. The government refused to accept the dead bodies of many officers, an issue that provoked outrage and protests in the Northern Areas. Pakistan initially did not acknowledge many of its casualties, but Sharif later said that over 4,000 Pakistani troops were killed in the operation. Responding to this, Pervez Musharraf said, "It hurts me when an ex-premier undermines his own forces", and claimed that Indian casualties were more than that of Pakistan. The legacy of Kargil war still continues to be debated on Pakistan's news channels and television political correspondents, which Musharraf repeatedly appeared to justify.

Many in Pakistan had expected a victory over the Indian military based on Pakistani official reports on the war, but were dismayed by the turn of events and questioned the eventual retreat. The military leadership is believed to have felt let down by the prime minister's decision to withdraw the remaining fighters. However, some authors, including Musharraf's close friend and former American CENTCOM Commander General Anthony Zinni, and former Prime minister Nawaz Sharif, state that it was General Musharraf who requested Sharif to withdraw the Pakistani troops. In 2012, Musharraf's senior officer and retired major-general Abdul Majeed Malik maintained that Kargil was a "total disaster" and bitterly criticised General Musharraf. Pointing out the fact that Pakistan was in no position to fight India in that area; the Nawaz Sharif government initiated the diplomatic process by involving the US President Bill Clinton and got Pakistan out of the difficult scenario. Malik maintained that soldiers were not "Mujaheddin" but active-duty serving officers and soldiers of the Pakistan Army.

In a national security meeting with Prime minister Nawaz Sharif at the Joint Headquarters, General Musharraf became heavily involved with serious altercations with Chief of Naval Staff Admiral Fasih Bokhari who ultimately called for a court-martial against General Musharraf. With Sharif placing the onus of the Kargil attacks squarely on the army chief Pervez Musharraf, there was an atmosphere of uneasiness between the two. On 12 October 1999, General Musharraf staged a bloodless coup d'état, ousting Nawaz Sharif.

Benazir Bhutto, an opposition leader in the parliament and former prime minister, called the Kargil War "Pakistan's greatest blunder". Many ex-officials of the military and the Inter-Services Intelligence (Pakistan's principal intelligence agency) also believed that "Kargil was a waste of time" and "could not have resulted in any advantage" on the larger issue of Kashmir.
A retired Pakistan Army's Lieutenant-General Ali Kuli Khan, lambasted the war as "a disaster bigger than the East Pakistan tragedy", adding that the plan was "flawed in terms of its conception, tactical planning and execution" that ended in "sacrificing so many soldiers". The Pakistani media criticised the whole plan and the eventual climbdown from the Kargil heights since there were no gains to show for the loss of lives and it only resulted in international condemnation.

Despite calls by many, no public commission of inquiry was set up in Pakistan to investigate the people responsible for initiating the conflict. The Pakistan Muslim League (PML(N)) published a white paper in 2006, which stated that Nawaz Sharif constituted an inquiry committee that recommended a court martial for General Pervez Musharraf, but Musharraf "stole the report" after toppling the government, to save himself. The report also claims that India knew about the plan 11 months before its launch, enabling a complete victory for India on military, diplomatic and economic fronts. A statement in June 2008 by a former X Corps commander and Director-General of Military Intelligence (M.I.) that time, Lieutenant-General (retired) Jamshed Gulzar Kiani said that: "As Prime minister, Nawaz Sharif "was never briefed by the army" on the Kargil attack, reignited the demand for a probe of the episode by legal and political groups.

Though the Kargil conflict had brought the Kashmir dispute into international focus, which was one of Pakistan's aims, it had done so in negative circumstances that eroded its credibility, since the infiltration came just after a peace process between the two countries had been concluded. The sanctity of the LOC too received international recognition. President Clinton's move to ask Islamabad to withdraw hundreds of armed militants from Indian-administered Kashmir was viewed by many in Pakistan as indicative of a clear shift in US policy against Pakistan.

After the war, a few changes were made to the Pakistan armed forces. In recognition of the Northern Light Infantry's performance in the war, which even drew praise from a retired Indian Lt. General, the regiment was incorporated into the regular army. The war showed that despite a tactically sound plan that had the element of surprise, little groundwork had been done to gauge the political ramifications. And like previous unsuccessful infiltrations attempts, such as Operation Gibraltar, which sparked the 1965 war, there was little co-ordination or information sharing among the branches of the Pakistani Armed Forces. One US Intelligence study is reported to have stated that Kargil was yet another example of Pakistan's (lack of) grand strategy, repeating the follies of the previous wars. In 2013, General Musharraf's close collaborator and confidential subordinate Lieutenant General (retired) Shahid Aziz revealed to Pakistan's news televisions and electronic media, that "[Kargil] adventure' was India's intelligence failure and Pakistan's miscalculated move, the Kargil operation was known only to General Parvez Musharraf and four of his close collaborators".

Casualties

Pakistan army losses have been difficult to determine. Pakistan confirmed that 453 soldiers were killed. The US Department of State had made an early, partial estimate of close to 700 fatalities. According to numbers stated by Nawaz Sharif there were over 4,000 fatalities. His PML (N) party in its "white paper" on the war mentioned that more than 3,000 Mujahideens, officers and soldiers were killed. Another major Pakistani political party, the Pakistan Peoples Party, also says that "thousands" of soldiers and irregulars died. Indian estimates stand at 1,042 Pakistani soldiers killed. Musharraf, in his Hindi version of his memoirs, titled "Agnipath", differs from all the estimates stating that 357 troops were killed with a further 665 wounded. Apart from General Musharraf's figure on the number of Pakistanis wounded, the number of people injured in the Pakistan camp is not yet fully known although they are at least more than 400 according to Pakistan army's website. One Indian pilot was officially captured during the fighting, while there were eight Pakistani soldiers who were captured during the fighting, and were repatriated on 13 August 1999.
India gave its official casualty figures as 527 dead and 1,363 wounded.

Kargil War Memorial, India

The Kargil War memorial, built by the Indian Army, is located in Dras, in the foothills of the Tololing Hill. The memorial, located about 5 km from the city centre across the Tiger Hill, commemorates the martyrs of the Kargil War. A poem "Pushp Kii Abhilasha" (Wish of a Flower) by Makhanlal Chaturvedi, a renowned 20th century neo-romantic Hindi poet, is inscribed on the gateway of the memorial greets visitors. The names of the soldiers who lost their lives in the War are inscribed on the Memorial Wall and can be read by visitors. A museum attached to the Kargil War Memorial, which was established to celebrate the victory of Operation Vijay, houses pictures of Indian soldiers, archives of important war documents and recordings, Pakistani war equipments and gear, and official emblems of the Army from the Kargil war.

A giant national flag, weighing 15 kg was hoisted at the Kargil war memorial on Kargil Vijay Diwas to commemorate the 13th anniversary of India's victory in the war.

Popular culture
The brief conflict provided considerable dramatic material for filmmakers and authors in India. Some documentaries which were shot on the subject were used by the ruling party coalition, led by Bharatiya Janata Party (BJP), in furthering its election campaign that immediately followed the war. The following is a list of the major films and dramas on the subject.
 Lord John Marbury is a 1999 episode in the first season of The West Wing which depicts a fictionalised representation of the Kargil conflict.
 Pentagram's single, 'Price of Bullets', released in 1999 dealt with the Kargil War.
 Shaheed-E-Kargil (2001), a Hindi movie directed by Dilip Gulati was released in 2001, based on the incident of Kargil conflict.
 LOC: Kargil (2003), a Hindi movie which depicts many incidents from the war was one of the longest in Indian movie history, running for more than four hours.
 Lakshya (2004), another Hindi movie portraying a fictionalised account of the conflict. Movie critics have generally appreciated the realistic portrayal of characters. The film also received good reviews in Pakistan because it portrays both sides fairly.
 Sainika (2002), the Kannada film directed by Mahesh Sukhdhare depicted the life of a soldier with Kargil war as one of the events. Starring C.P.Yogishwar and Sakshi Shivanand.
 Dhoop (2003), Hindi film directed by Ashwini Chaudhary depicted the life of Anuj Nayyar's parents after his death. Anuj Nayyar was a captain in the Indian army and was awarded Maha Vir Chakra posthumously. Om Puri plays the role of S.K. Nayyar, Anuj's father.
 Mission Fateh – Real Stories of Kargil Heroes, a TV series telecast on Sahara channel chronicling the Indian Army's missions.
 Fifty Day War – A theatrical production on the war, directed by Aamir Raza Husain, the title indicating the length of the Kargil conflict. This was claimed to be the biggest production of its kind in Asia, budget of Rs. 15 million, involving real aircraft and explosions in an outdoor setting.
 Kurukshetra (2008) – A Malayalam film directed by a former Indian Army Major Ravi (Retd) based on his experience of Kargil War.
 Laag (2000) – A Pakistani film-drama based on the armed intrusions and struggle of Pakistan army soldiers in the conflict.
 Kargil Kartoons (1999) – With the support of eight leading cartoonists, Shekhar Gurera compiled a collection of cartoons dedicated to the Indian defence forces. He also coordinated Kargil Kartoons (A Collection of Cartoons and a chain of Cartoon Exhibition), the solidarity gesture of drawing on-the-spot cartoons of army men who passing through the New Delhi railway station on their way to Kargil. The cartoons on Kargil War were later exhibited at The Lalit Kala Academy, New Delhi. 25–31 July 1999, followed by the chain exhibition of cartoons at Jaipur, Chandigarh, Patna and Indore.
 Stumped (2003) – A film expressing the mixed emotions of 1999 Cricket World Cup celebrations and mourning associated with individual's casualty in the Kargil war.
 Mausam (2011), romantic drama film directed by Pankaj Kapoor, spanned over the period between 1992 and 2002 covering major events.
 Gunjan Saxena: The Kargil Girl (2020) – An Indian biographical film was based on life of Indian Air Force pilot Gunjan Saxena, the first Indian female air force pilot in combat during Kargil War.
 Shershaah (2021) – An Indian war film was based on life of Indian army captain Vikram Batra.
 Laal Singh Chaddha (2022) an Indian remake of Forrest Gump.

The impact of the war in the sporting arena was visible during the India-Pakistan clash in the 1999 Cricket World Cup, which coincided with the Kargil timeline. The game witnessed heightened passions and was one of the most viewed matches in the tournament.

See also
 Indo-Pakistani wars and conflicts
 Gudiya, Kargil war victim
 Kambampati Nachiketa, Prisoner of war

Notes

 Ashwani Shrotriya. "Operation Vijay: Everything You Need To Know In 4 Minutes", Dainik Bhaskar

Footnotes

  Names for the conflict: There have been various names for the conflict. During the actual fighting in Kargil, the Indian Government was careful not to use the term "war", calling it a "war-like situation", even though both nations indicated that they were in a "state of war". Terms like Kargil "conflict", Kargil "incident" or the official military assault, "Operation Vijay", were thus preferred. After the end of the war however, the Indian Government increasingly called it the "Kargil War", even though there had been no official declaration of war. Other less popularly used names included "Third Kashmir War" and Pakistan's codename given to the infiltration: "Operation Badr".

References
 Asymmetric Warfare in South Asia: The Cause and Consequences of the 1999 Limited War in Kargil the CCC Kargil Project.
 Limited Conflict Under the Nuclear Umbrella (RAND Corporation)
 War in Kargil (Center for Contemporary Conflict) (PDF)
 Essay on the outcomes of the Kargil War 
 
  (Executive summary of the report, Online)
 Limited War with Pakistan: Will It Secure India's Interests? ACDIS Occasional Paper by Suba Chandran, Published 2004 by Program in Arms Control, Disarmament, and International Security (ACDIS), University of Illinois.
 An Analysis of the Kargil Conflict 1999, by Shaukat Qadir, RUSI Journal, April 2002

Further reading

Indian literature on Kargil war
 
 
 
 
 
 
 <

Pakistan literature on Kargil theatre

External links

 
 Indian Armed Forces site on Kargil
 Impact of the conflict on civilians – BBC
 Full list of gallantry awards (India) - page 106-118

 
1999 in India
1999 in international relations
1999 in Pakistan
Conflicts in 1999
Kargil
Indo-Pakistani wars
July 1999 events in Asia
June 1999 events in Asia
Kashmir conflict
May 1999 events in Asia
Nawaz Sharif administration
Vajpayee administration
Wars involving India